The 2011 World Junior Short Track Speed Skating Championships took place between 25 and 27 February 2011 in Courmayeur, Italy at the Forum Sport Center ice rink.  The World Championships are organised by the ISU which also run world cups and championships in speed skating and figure skating.

This event was a qualification for the short track speed skating events at the 2012 Winter Youth Olympics.

Medal summary

Medal table

Men's events

No medal was awarded in the men's 500 metre event, because the other two skaters were disqualified.

Women's events

Participating nations 
159 athletes from 33 countries participated.

See also
Short track speed skating
World Junior Short Track Speed Skating Championships

References

External links
Results book

World Junior Short Track Speed Skating Championships
World Junior Short Track Speed Skating Championships
World Junior Short Track Speed Skating Championships
International speed skating competitions hosted by Italy
World Junior Short Track Speed Skating Championships
World Junior Short Track Speed Skating
Sport in Courmayeur